William Henry Brouse (June 15, 1824 – August 23, 1881) was a Canadian physician and politician.

Born in Matilda Township, Dundas County, Upper Canada of German ancestry, he attended Upper Canada Academy in Cobourg, Canada West in 1839, Victoria College until 1845, and received his Doctor of Medicine degree in 1847 from McGill College.

He was first elected to the House of Commons of Canada representing the Ontario riding of Grenville South in the 1872 federal election. A Liberal, he was re-elected in 1874. He was nominated to the Senate of Canada in 1878 representing the senatorial division of Prescott, Ontario and sat as a Reformer until his death in 1881.

He was commissioned as the Surgeon of the 56th (Grenville) Battalion of Infantry on April 12th, 1867, and was active in matters of the Canadian Militia. He successfully campaigned for, a $50,000 annual grant for the veterans of the War of 1812 and he proposed, unsuccessfully, that recognition be granted to the militia veterans of the rebellions of 1837–38.

He was the nephew of George Brouse, an Upper Canada MP.

References
 
 

1824 births
1881 deaths
Canadian senators from Ontario
Liberal Party of Canada MPs
Members of the House of Commons of Canada from Ontario
McGill University Faculty of Medicine alumni
People from the United Counties of Stormont, Dundas and Glengarry